Gary Agnew (born May 24, 1960) is a Canadian ice hockey coach currently serving as an associate coach with the Abbotsford Canucks. He was formerly an assistant coach with the Pittsburgh Penguins of the National Hockey League. He has also served as an assistant coach with the St. Louis Blues and Columbus Blue Jackets of the National Hockey League.

Playing career
As a player, Agnew played four years for the University of New Brunswick, and then for the Fredericton Express of the American Hockey League and the Milwaukee Admirals of the International Hockey League.

Coaching career
In 1990 Agnew took over the head coaching job of the London Knights of the Ontario Hockey League. He won the Matt Leyden Trophy as Coach of the Year in 1992–93. In 1994–95 Agnew took over the coaching job of the Kingston Frontenacs and led them to their first division title in 1994–95. He moved back to the Knights from 1997 to 2000 and won another Matt Leyden Trophy in 1997–98. From 2000–2006 he assumed the reins of the Syracuse Crunch of the American Hockey League. In 2006, he graduated to become the assistant coach of the Columbus Blue Jackets. He held the record for most wins in Crunch history with 220, before being surpassed by Ben Groulx in 2022.

With the November 13, 2006 firing of Columbus Blue Jackets head coach Gerard Gallant, Agnew was named interim head coach. On November 22, Ken Hitchcock was named the new head coach. Agnew led the team in that evening's game, with Hitchcock set to take over the following day. Agnew's record as interim head coach was 0–4–1. It was reported on June 16, 2010 that new Blue Jackets head coach Scott Arniel had fired Agnew as assistant coach.

On June 15, 2012, the St. Louis Blues announced Agnew had been hired as an assistant coach, under the direction of Ken Hitchcock. He was relieved of his duties on May 7, 2014.

It was announced on July 10, 2014, that the Pittsburgh Penguins had hired Agnew as an assistant coach. Agnew and head coach Mike Johnston were fired on December 12, 2015.

Agnew was hired by the Vancouver Canucks for the associate coach position for their American Hockey League (AHL) affiliate Utica Comets, under head coach Trent Cull, for the 2017–18 season. He retained the associate coaching position with organization when the affiliate relocated as the Abbotsford Canucks in 2021.

Personal life
Agnew's daughter, Lindsay, is a professional soccer player. He has a master's degree in coaching from the University of Western Ontario.

Coaching record

References

External links

1960 births
Canadian ice hockey coaches
Canadian ice hockey forwards
Columbus Blue Jackets coaches
Ice hockey people from Ontario
Kingston Frontenacs coaches
Living people
London Knights coaches
Pittsburgh Penguins coaches
St. Louis Blues coaches
Sportspeople from Niagara Falls, Ontario
University of New Brunswick alumni
University of Western Ontario alumni
Milwaukee Admirals (IHL) players
Fredericton Express players